4. Liga is the fourth-tier football league in Slovakia. It currently consists of eight groups.

Name

References

 
4
Slovakia
Professional sports leagues in Slovakia